Joel Andrew Fitzgibbon (born 16 January 1962) is a retired Australian politician. He is a member of the Australian Labor Party (ALP) and has served in the House of Representatives from 1996 to 2022, representing the New South Wales seat of Hunter. He served as Minister for Defence (2007–2009) in the first Rudd Government and Minister for Agriculture, Fisheries and Forestry (2013) in the second Rudd Government. He was also Chief Government Whip in the House of Representatives (2010–2013) in the Gillard Government.

Fitzgibbon succeeded his father Eric in federal parliament. He is aligned with the Centre Unity faction in NSW, part of the federal Labor Right faction.  Since the 2019 election, he has become a vocal critic of stronger climate change policies, calling a potential 2030 target "delusional", and claiming that any embrace of more ambitious policies will alienate working-class support of Labor.

Early life
Fitzgibbon was born on 16 January 1962 in Bellingen, New South Wales. He is the son of Anne and Eric Fitzgibbon. His father, a schoolteacher, served as mayor of Cessnock and was elected to federal parliament in 1984.

Fitzgibbon attended All Saints College, Maitland. He worked as an automotive electrician from 1978 to 1990, operating a small business. He completed a graduate certificate in business administration at the University of Newcastle and was also a part-time TAFE lecturer.

Political career
Fitzgibbon served on the Cessnock City Council from 1987 to 1995, including as deputy mayor from 1989 to 1990. He was a vice-president of the ALP's Cessnock branch and served as a delegate to state conference. From 1990 he worked as an electorate officer for his father.

Early career in federal politics
Fitzgibbon won ALP preselection for the seat of Hunter following his father's retirement prior to the 1996 federal election. He suffered a seven-point swing in 1996, but has been re-elected with little trouble since then, with the exception of the 2013 election, where his margin was significantly reduced. He was elected to the opposition shadow ministry in October 1998 and was appointed Shadow Minister for Mining, Energy and Forestry in 2003–05. In June 2005 he was appointed shadow assistant treasurer and shadow minister for revenue and for small business and competition. In early December 2006, when Kevin Rudd became leader of the opposition, Fitzgibbon was appointed shadow minister for defence. He was subsequently appointed minister for defence when Labor won office at the 2007 federal election.

Minister for Defence

In 2008 Fitzgibbon expressed dissatisfaction with an unclassified briefing he received on an assessment of the Joint Strike Fighter (JSF). He subsequently ordered and received a classified report that addressed his concerns, and then expressed confidence in the JSF project. In the same interview, he denied any personal involvement in the Australian Federal Police (AFP) raid on the home of Canberra Times''' journalist Philip Dorling, although he did not guarantee that his department had not contacted the AFP. Dorling was accused of receiving confidential cabinet documents intended for Fitzgibbon.

On 22 October 2008, Fitzgibbon instructed the Department of Defence to cease debt recovery procedures against SAS soldiers who had been accidentally overpaid. A subsequent audit by KPMG discovered that the soldiers' pay continued to be docked after the ministerial instruction.

In May 2009, Fitzgibbon announced a new defence white paper titled Defending Australia in the Asia Pacific Century: Force 2030.

Controversy

On 26 March 2009, Fairfax Media'' reported that officers in the Department of Defence had conducted a covert and unauthorised investigation into Fitzgibbon's friendship with a Chinese-Australian businesswoman in the belief that it constituted a security risk. This was alleged to have included officers from the Defence Signals Directorate accessing the computer network in Fitzgibbon's office to obtain the woman's bank details. The Department launched an urgent inquiry into the reports. Nick Warner, the Department's Secretary, stated that he had not seen any information to confirm the claims and that there were no circumstances in which secret investigations into Ministers could be authorised. Fitzgibbon was reported to be "furious" about the investigation, and suggested that it may have been conducted by officials opposed to his reforms to the Australian Defence Organisation.

Fitzgibbon resigned as Minister for Defence on 4 June 2009 after admitting that meetings held between his brother Mark Fitzgibbon, the head of the health fund NIB, and Defence officials concerning business opportunities had breached the Ministerial Code of Conduct.

In 2013, Fitzgibbon reflected on his term as Defence Minister and said that the defence chiefs had an obsession for the JSF and had refused to consider other alternatives.

43rd Parliament
Following his re-election in the 2010 federal election, Fitzgibbon was elected by the Labor caucus as chief government whip.

Following the June 2013 Labor leadership spill, Fitzgibbon was appointed as Minister for Agriculture, Fisheries and Forestry in the Second Rudd ministry.

2015 proposed abolition of Hunter

In 2015 the Australian Electoral Commission announced plans to abolish the federation seat of Hunter. Due to changing populations, overall New South Wales was to lose a seat while Western Australia was to gain an extra seat. Electors in the north of Hunter were to join New England. The roughly 40 percent remainder were to become part of Paterson, with the Liberal margin calculated to be notionally reduced from 9.8 to just 0.5 points as a result. Since the Commission's guidelines require it to preserve the names of original electorates where possible, the commission proposed renaming Charlton to Hunter.

The final plan, however, saw Charlton abolished, with Hunter pushed slightly eastward to absorb much of Charlton's former territory. While most of the new Hunter's voters come from the old Charlton, as previously mentioned, Commission guidelines required the name of Hunter to be retained. The Labor incumbent for Charlton, Pat Conroy, opted to contest neighbouring Shortland in order to allow Fitzgibbon to contest the new Hunter.

2019 election and aftermath

In the 2019 federal election, Fitzgibbon suffered a 9.5-point swing against him in his electorate, reducing his margin to just 3 points. After the election, he was a vocal critic of his party's direction, claiming that "Labor must reconnect with its blue-collar base and get back to the centre". He stated that he was considering running in the leadership ballot if other candidates do not "show more interest in regional Australia". He later endorsed Anthony Albanese as leader, who won unopposed. In November 2020, Fitzgibbon announced that he was quitting the shadow cabinet, a response to moves by Labor's Left Faction to push for more action on climate change which, he believes are "delusional."

In September 2021, Fitzgibbon announced his retirement at the next election, claiming that he has been successful in bringing back the Labor Party to the political centre.

Political positions
As the Labor Shadow Agriculture spokesman, Fitzgibbon opposed the Government's decision to stop the sale of S. Kidman & Co as "political" and accused it of running a "discriminatory foreign investment regime".

Fitzgibbon serves as the convenor of the NSW Right faction in federal parliament.

See also
 First Rudd Ministry
 Second Rudd Ministry

References

External links

|-

|-

1962 births
Living people
Australian Labor Party members of the Parliament of Australia
Labor Right politicians
Members of the Australian House of Representatives for Hunter
Members of the Australian House of Representatives
Members of the Cabinet of Australia
Rudd Government
Defence ministers of Australia
21st-century Australian politicians
20th-century Australian politicians
Government ministers of Australia
Deputy mayors of places in Australia
New South Wales local councillors